Bud J. Roberts Jr. is a fictional character in the JAG TV series (played by Patrick Labyorteaux), created by Donald P. Bellisario as a work-for-hire for Paramount Television.

Bud Roberts made two appearances in the first season of JAG before becoming a regular part of the ensemble cast for the next nine seasons. Bud Roberts has also appeared three times on NCIS, two of them long after JAG had ended.

Character arc

On JAG
Bud Roberts is a military brat, the son of retired Master Chief Petty Officer "Big Bud" Roberts, Sr. (Jeff MacKay). Bud Roberts, Jr., joined the Navy through Naval Reserve Officers Training Corps (NROTC), and as an ensign, he is assigned to sea duty aboard the USS Seahawk as a public affairs officer (PAO) under Captain Ross (Bill Bolender). It is during this role as the PAO aboard the USS Seahawk that he first meets Lieutenant Harmon Rabb (David James Elliott) and his partner Lieutenant JG Caitlin Pike (Andrea Parker), when they arrive to investigate a murder. Bud's last meeting with LCDR Rabb prior to his transfer to JAG Headquarters is in the first-season cliff-hanger, when Rabb is dispatched to investigate the murder of a former Academy classmate (and a love interest). This gets him interested in a career in law, and it is later LTJG Meg Austin who recommends him for transfer to JAG prior to her own transfer from JAG staff.

He attends law school in the evenings, at George Mason University School of Law, and upon scoring top grades in his finals, is assigned extra legal responsibilities and acts as a trial counsel for special courts-martial. His wife, Harriet Sims, and Sarah MacKenzie are the only people Roberts will allow to view his law school grades. He, his younger brother, Mikey (Michael Bellisario), and his sister, Winifred (Winnie), have a somewhat strained relationship with their father, who raised them himself after the death of their mother, due to his physical and sometimes abusive methods of disciplining them.

Roberts is well-liked and well respected by everyone at JAG headquarters and is often considered one of the better trial lawyers there. His success rate in the courtroom is often boosted by his opponents' underestimation of him and his abilities. Harm once says of him, "Watch out for his 'Aw, shucks, I have a lot to learn' routine", alluding to Roberts' ability to appear less intelligent than he actually is.

Though not the physical type, Bud has been known to become so when the situation demands it; he once catches a punch thrown by his father and is able to subdue the larger man without difficulty. The incident where his jaw is broken when he steps between two simultaneous punches from Rabb and the Royal Australian Navy officer Lieutenant Commander Mic Brumby (Trevor Goddard) outside of an Australian courtroom has more to do with the physical limitations of the human body than a lack of physical prowess.

LTJG Roberts marries Ensign Harriet Sims in 1998. Together, they have five children: 
 A.J. Roberts (named in the honor of RADM A.J. Chegwidden, however not taking his proper first and middle names Albert Jethro)
 Sarah Roberts (named in the honor of Lt Col Sarah MacKenzie). Unfortunately, the child dies due to complications in childbirth.
 James Kirk Roberts (named in the honor of Capt. James T. Kirk). Bud is a big fan of Star Trek.
 Unnamed twins (a boy and a girl) born toward the end of the series (the girl is called Nikki in the tenth season).

In one episode, Bud Roberts is selected to carry the nuclear football. He has trepidations about this duty because he is worried that he will be responsible for the deaths of many innocent people. While he is on duty at the White House as the Navy Aide to the President, the president whose "nuclear football" he is guarding (George W. Bush) attends a conference. During this conference, Bud has to go to the bathroom. When he reemerges, the president is gone. Bud then runs the three miles to the White House with the 40-pound nuclear football.

Lieutenant Bud Roberts is assigned as Judge Advocate aboard the USS Seahawk during the beginning of the War on Terrorism in 2002. He loses a leg trying to save a boy from a field of landmines in Afghanistan that year. He is transferred back to JAG HQ after his operation and proving that he is still able to meet the fitness requirements of the U.S. Navy.

After returning to JAG headquarters following the loss of his lower right leg from a landmine, Bud is assigned to work disability cases; he proves his worth to JAG when he investigates and successfully turns in a refusal of benefits when he notices a sailor damaging his eyes with self-inflicted laser burns. Shortly thereafter, Bud returns to full limited duty in the courtroom.

Roberts is promoted to the rank of Lieutenant Commander in 2004 at the end of the ninth season, which is the final official act of command of Rear Admiral A.J. Chegwidden as the Judge Advocate General, at his dining out. Bud had already been passed over for promotion twice, meaning that if he were to be passed over a third time, he would be involuntarily separated from the Navy. It is mentioned in dialogue that Admiral Chegwidden had made a vigorous argument citing all existing precedent of the other handicapped commissioned officers in the United States Armed Forces who had been promoted since the Second World War before the Secretary of the Navy to get Bud his promotion.

In the series' final episode, LCDR Roberts chooses to remain at JAG HQ after being offered billets by both Captain Harmon Rabb and Lieutenant Colonel Sarah MacKenzie.

On NCIS
Bud Roberts also appears in the first season of the JAG spin-off NCIS (which took place simultaneously with Season 9 of JAG), where Special Agent Leroy Jethro Gibbs (Mark Harmon) hopes Roberts will help "lawyer" him past a prohibition on the use of the DNA profiles stored by the Department of Defense.

He then reappears after an absence of more than eleven years in the fourteenth season, having been promoted to captain and still assigned to JAG Headquarters, where he meets up with Special Agent Timothy McGee (Sean Murray) and assists the NCIS MCRT in the investigation of the homicide of a fellow JAG officer. McGee asks him about Harm and Mac, but Roberts is interrupted by the arrival of Special Agent Alexandra Quinn (Jennifer Esposito) before he can reveal the results of the series' controversial final coin toss.

The next year, while serving as Commanding Officer, Regional Legal Service Office Mid-Atlantic at Naval Station Norfolk, Bud assists Special Agent Gibbs in the death investigation of one of his JAG officers.

Dates of rank

Awards and decorations
The following are the medals and service awards fictionally worn by Bud Roberts, as seen in the NCIS episodes "Rogue" and "Dark Secrets".
 

 Bud was awarded the Purple Heart after stepping on a landmine, and losing his right leg.
 On JAG, Bud wore the Sea Service Deployment Ribbon (with a service star in later seasons); in NCIS, the Sea Service Deployment Ribbon has been replaced by the Navy & Marine Corps Overseas Service Ribbon (with two service stars).
 As the Commanding Officer of a Regional Legal Service Office, Bud is eligible to wear the Command Ashore insignia.

References

JAG (TV series) characters
NCIS (TV series) characters
Crossover characters in television
Fictional amputees
Television characters introduced in 1995
Fictional American lawyers
Fictional lieutenants
Fictional lieutenant commanders
Fictional military captains
Fictional navy personnel
Fictional United States Navy officers
Fictional War in Afghanistan (2001–2021) veterans